Ekeberg is a surname. Notable people with the surname include:

 Anders Gustaf Ekeberg (1767–1813), Swedish chemist 
 Arne Ekeberg (born 1925), Norwegian judge 
 Birger Ekeberg (1880–1968), Swedish jurist
 Carl Gustaf Ekeberg (1716–1784), Swedish physician, chemist and explorer
 Herman Ekeberg (born 1972), Norwegian football player

Surnames of Swedish origin
Surnames of Norwegian origin